Jefferson White is an American actor. He plays Jimmy Hurdstrom on the Paramount Network series Yellowstone and Sean O’Neil on Chicago P.D. on NBC.

Career
White made his television debut on The Americans in 2014, and further television appearances included Elementary, Blue Bloods, How to Get Away with Murder and Law & Order: Special Victims Unit. 

In 2018, White appeared on season one of Yellowstone for Paramount+, and his character, a troubled cowboy called Jimmy Hurdstrom, would became a recurring and then main character. In 2021, White was named as a nominee for the Screen Actors Guild Award for Outstanding Performance by an Ensemble in a Drama Series for his work on Yellowstone. White’s character Jimmy is expected to feature in a forthcoming Yellowstone spin-off series titled 6666 as his character Jimmy moved to the 6666 Ranch in Texas during season 4 of Yellowstone. White’s character Jimmy still appeared in the fifth season of Yellowstone in 2022.

In September 2022, White was introduced as the character Sean O’Neil in the tenth season of NBC's long-running drama Chicago P.D..  White has a role in the 2023 feature film Eileen, which stars Anne Hathaway, and the upcoming Alex Garland film  Civil War.

Personal life
White grew up in Mount Vernon, Iowa and attended Iowa State University, graduating in 2012 in performing arts.

Filmography

Film and television

External links

References

 1987 births
Living people
Iowa State University alumni
Male actors from Iowa